Mario Alvarez Martinez (July 6, 1957 – January 14, 2018) was an Olympic weightlifter for the United States.  His coach was Jim Schmitz.

Early life
Martinez was born and raised on a ranch in Soledad, California. At a young age, Martinez strength trained under a tree with a non-revolving exercise bar and weights. He tied some of these weights on the bar with just a rope so that they would stay on while he would lift. Martinez was so strong that he eventually began bending all of his bars because of all the weight he load on. He would then take a hammer and bend the bars back into place to straighten them and continue on with his training.

Career
Martinez's lifting career in Olympic weightlifting lasted for over 23 years. Throughout his career, he earned himself 10 national championships, 3 Olympics including a silver medal and a 4th-place finish, 3 Pan Am medals, on top of being the first American to snatch over 400 lb and clean & jerk over 500 lb in competition. Martinez had very rough training techniques. He was well known for his bent-arm pulling style. When he would rack his cleans, only his finger tips would be on the bar and he had to regrip for the jerk. When his hands were to slip off, he would have to grab the bar again.

Weightlifting achievements
Silver Medalist in Olympic Games (1984)
Olympic Games team member (1984, 1988, and 1992)
Silver Medalist in Senior World Championships (1984)
Pan Am Games Champion (1987)
Silver Medalist in Pan Am Games (1991)
Bronze Medalist in Pan Am Games (1995)
Senior National Champion (1982-1989, 1992, and 1992)
Senior American record holder in snatch, clean and jerk, and total (1972-1992)

References

External links
Mario Martinez's profile at Sports Reference.com

1957 births
2018 deaths
American male weightlifters
Weightlifters at the 1984 Summer Olympics
Weightlifters at the 1988 Summer Olympics
Weightlifters at the 1992 Summer Olympics
Weightlifters at the 1991 Pan American Games
Weightlifters at the 1995 Pan American Games
Sportspeople from Salinas, California
Pan American Games medalists in weightlifting
Pan American Games gold medalists for the United States
Pan American Games silver medalists for the United States
Pan American Games bronze medalists for the United States
Medalists at the 1984 Summer Olympics
Olympic silver medalists for the United States in weightlifting
Medalists at the 1991 Pan American Games
Medalists at the 1995 Pan American Games
20th-century American people
21st-century American people